Wang Lianyuan (born August 26, 1994) is a Chinese triathlete. She placed 48th in the women's triathlon at the 2016 Summer Olympics.

She won the bronze medal in the women's individual event at the 2014 Asian Games.

References

1994 births
Living people
Chinese female triathletes
Olympic triathletes of China
Triathletes at the 2016 Summer Olympics
Asian Games medalists in triathlon
Triathletes at the 2014 Asian Games
Asian Games bronze medalists for China
Medalists at the 2014 Asian Games
Sportspeople from Yantai